Ystad Station is a railway station which is the terminal station of both the Ystad Line and the Österlen Line. The station is located in Ystad in Skåne County, Sweden, and is served by the Skåne Commuter Rail and DSB.

Service
The Skåne Commuter Rail operates a half-hour headway along the line using X61 (used to be X11) trains, with some of the services continuing along the Österlen Line. Travel time to Malmö Central Station is about 45 minutes. DSB operates three daily InterCity Bornholm trains from Copenhagen Central Station, which connects with BornholmerFærgen ferries to reach the Danish island of Bornholm. Travel time to Copenhagen is slightly less than two hours.

History
The station was established in 1866 as the western terminus of the Ystad–Eslöv Line (which would later become the Österlen Line). The connection with the Ystad Line opened in 1874. The various railways were nationalized in the early 1940s, and from the 1950 Y6 diesel railcars were introduced. In 1985, the SiTY Train was launched between Simrishamn, Tomelilla and Ystad, using Y1 diesel railcars. They were rebranded Österlensaren in the late 1990s. In 1996 the Ystad Line was electrified. In 1997, Malmöhus County and Kristianstad County were merged to create Skåne County, resulting in the Skåne Commuter Rail being extended from Ystad to Simrishamn. Electrification of the Österlen Line started in 2001 and was completed in 2003.

In 2008, the station was used as a setting in the filming of an episode of Wallander (British TV series).

References

Railway stations in Skåne County
Railway stations opened in 1866
1866 establishments in Sweden
19th-century establishments in Skåne County